Rossburg may refer to:

Rossburg, Indiana, an unincorporated community
Rossburg, Minnesota, an unincorporated community
Rossburg, Ohio, a village in Darke County
Rossburg, Warren County, Ohio, an unincorporated community